Lelio dalla Volpe (17 September 1685 – 6 October 1749) was a Bolognese Italian publisher of the 18th century. After the founder's death, his business was carried on by his son, Petronio dalla Volpe (16 November 1721 – 18 September 1794).

External links

18th-century Italian people
Italian printers
1685 births
1749 deaths